Mount Leonard Kniaseff, or simply Leonard Kniaseff (or Leonard Kniazeff), is a stratovolcano between the municipalities of Mabini and Maco in the province of Davao de Oro, island of Mindanao, Philippines.

It has a  diameter caldera lake called Lake Leonard. Amacan Thermal Area is located 5 aerial kilometer south-southwest of Lake Leonard.

Leonard Kniaseff is one of the active volcanoes in the Philippines, part of the Pacific ring of fire.

Activity 
The Leonard Kniaseff Volcano's area has been an object to a geothermal exploration program.

Manat thermal area is north of Lake Leonard, solfataras occur around its southwest rim, and active solfataras, fumaroles, and hot springs are found in the Amacan-Gopod thermal area south of the lake.

There was a scare in 1995 but PHIVOLCS' investigation at that time did not disclose any unusual activity, and no unusual activity has been reported since then.

Its last eruption was dated as early as  AD.

See also
 List of active volcanoes in the Philippines
 List of potentially active volcanoes in the Philippines
 List of inactive volcanoes in the Philippines
 Philippine Institute of Volcanology and Seismology

References

External links 
 Philippine Institute of Volcanology and Seismology (PHIVOLCS), Leonard Kniaseff page

Mountains of the Philippines
Volcanoes of Mindanao
Stratovolcanoes of the Philippines
Active volcanoes of the Philippines
Landforms of Davao de Oro